Tillandsia krukoffiana is a plant species in the genus Tillandsia. This species is endemic to Bolivia.

References 

krukoffiana
Flora of Bolivia